Mahajana Law College, Mysore was started in 1992 under the guidance of Prof. CKN Raja. It is situated in Jayalakshmipuram. Mahajana Law College is affiliated to Mysore University and approved by the Bar Council of India 

At present Mahajana Law College has about 400 students. Prof. K. Rajashekara is the present principal of the college. The college offers courses in 3 years and 5 years LL.B.

Mahajana Law College brings out a law journal every year to which legal luminaries from all over the world contribute to it.
SBRR Mahajana First Grade College is a sister institution located at Jayalakshmipuram, Mysore.

Notable Alumnae 
 Arun Kumar Bafna, Cricketer
 Vishnu S Warrier, Author & Editor-in-Chief The Lex-Warrier: Online Law Journal

References

See also
 SBRR Mahajana First Grade College
 Mysore University

Law schools in Karnataka
Colleges affiliated to University of Mysore